Davis Island, one of the Thimble Islands off Stony Creek, a section of Branford, Connecticut, was the site of President William Howard Taft's "Summer White House".

See also
Thimble Islands
Outer Lands

References
Wealthy Widow Buying Up Thimbles, "New Haven Register", January 22, 2006, page A1
Half a Mile Off the Coast; Stacey Stowe; "In the Region/Connecticut", The New York Times, July 30, 2006; Real Estate page 10.

Thimble Islands
Long Island Sound